Theodor Rogalski (April 11, 1901 - February 2, 1954) was a Romanian composer, conductor and pianist of Polish origin. He played an important role in the development of Romanian musical culture in the first half of the twentieth century.

Life and career
After studying in Bucharest with Alfonso Castaldi and Dimitrie Cuclin, he studied at the Leipzig Conservatory (1920 - 1923) and then at the Schola Cantorum in Paris (1923-1926), where he was a disciple of Vincent d'Indy (composition, conducting) and of Maurice Ravel (orchestration). In 1926, he won First Prize at the "George Enescu" National Composition Competition (established in 1913) with the work String Quartet in F major. He also entered the concert programs of the Philharmonic with Two Romanian Dances for Winds, Piano and Drums (1927) and Two Symphonic Sketches (1929), whose value has determined George Enescu to select it for the concert held at the International Exhibition in New York in 1939.

While continuing to explore the line opened by Burial at the outskirts and Dances for rain-Paparudele-, see Rainmaking (ritual) (both from the Two symphonic sketches) through the new technical approach of capitalizing the folk vein, with emphasis on rhythmic diversity, poly-tonal overlaps and a unique harmonic color, Theodor Rogalski composes, two decades later, in 1950, the symphonic suite Three Romanian Dances, which is a landmark of the Romanian music school of the time.

The two decades, 1930-1950, in which composing remained in the background, were dedicated by the musician to conducting and building an ensemble, from its establishment to the level of a prestigious orchestra, today bearing the name of National Radio Orchestra of Romania. As such, he was the first conductor of the orchestra starting from 1930.

The baton of first conductor was also offered to him at the "George Enescu" Philharmonic (1950-1954). 
In these last years of his life he also held the position of orchestration teacher at the Bucharest Conservatory.

List of compositions 

 1918 
-  Sonata for piano  (1921 - first mention of the "George Enescu" Composition Prize)

 1919 - Piano Suite 
- (1919 - 2nd mention of the "George Enescu" Composition Prize)

 1920 -
- Paysage for piano
- Pastoral for piano
- Berceuse for cello and piano
-  Piece for cello and piano
-  Historiette  for cello and piano
-  Minuetto  for cello and piano
-  Parfum exotique  for cello and piano
- "Pavanne" for cello and piano
-  Idylle  and  Tambourin  (For the motif "O du lieber Augustin") for string quartet
- The song "Le Silence", on lyrics by CH. Batillot
-  Orchesterstuck  (1923 - 2nd prize of the "George Enescu" Composition Prize)
- Operetta  Nina 

 1921 
-  Rondo 
- Sonet for piano
- Aubade for piano
 1922 - Winter for piano
-  Romanzetta  for piano
-  Suite for violin and piano: Aubade, Interlude, Sonet  (1922 - mention of the "George Enescu" Composition Prize)
-  Andante  from a projected  Sonata for cello and piano 
-  Vieille Chanson  for two violins and viola
-  Fruhlingsnacht  for 2 violins and cello
- Andantino for string quartet
- Dance for string quartet
-  2 lieds  for voice and piano on lyrics by R. Dehmel:  Erlengang ,  Einst im Herbst 
-  2 lieds  for voice and orchestra: lied on lyrics by Heine, untitled,  Helle Nacht  on lyrics by R. Dehmel

 1924 
- Idylle for piano

- Retrospective Serenade for piano

 1925 
-  Ballad on Romanian themes  for violin and piano
- Bourree for cello and piano
-  Canon , for violin, cello and piano
- String Quartet (1925 - 1st prize of the "George Enescu" Composition Prize)
- Four Evocations for the soprano: The Song of the Wise, The Song of the Lover, The Song of the Rain, The Song of the Swing
-  Two Romanian Dances for winds, piano and percussion  (1927 - mention in Venice)
-  Fresque Antique, ballet music 

 1928
- La Chef (on romanian themes), for string quartet

 1929
-  Two Symphonic Sketches: Burial at the outskirts, Dances for rain-Paparudele- (Rainmaking ritual) 

- Stage music for the "Don Juan" play by Victor Eftimiu

 1930
-  Three pieces for cello 

 1931 
-  Suite for oboe and piano 

 1932 
-  Two Capriccios for Orchestra 

 1933 
- Three songs on folk lyrics for soprano and orchestra:  Hora Ciciului ,  Willow,  The Lazar

 1940 
- Three Romanian Ballads for tenor and orchestra:  Iancu Jianu,  Mihu the Child, Toma Alimoș

 1941 
- Festive March for Orchestra

 1949
- 3 Pieces of Mechanical Music for Orchestra

 1950 
- Symphonic suite Three Romanian dances

 1951 
- Soundtrack for the film Life Triumphs

Notes

References

External links 
 Theodor Rogalski - Three Romanian Dances, Symphonic Suite (1950)
 Theodor Rogalski - Two Symphonic Sketches
 Theodor Rogalski (1901-1954)

Romanian classical composers
Romanian conductors (music)
1901 births
1954 deaths